Gabriel Jesús Iglesias (born July 15, 1976), also known as Fluffy, is an American stand-up comedian and actor. He has produced a number of stand-up specials for television outlets such as Comedy Central and Netflix, including I'm Not Fat… I'm Fluffy and Hot & Fluffy.  As an actor, he has appeared in numerous live-action and animated TV shows and films, including starring in the sitcom Mr. Iglesias on Netflix, playing Tobias in the 2012 movie Magic Mike and its 2015 sequel, and providing the voice of Speedy Gonzales in Space Jam: A New Legacy.  He was also the host of the shows Stand Up Revolution on Comedy Central and Fluffy's Food Adventures on Fuse.

In 2018, Iglesias was one of the top 10 paid comedians in the world.

Early life 
Gabriel Jesús Iglesias was born July 15, 1976 in San Diego, California, to Esther P. Mendez and Jesús Iglesias. His mother Esther raised him as a single mother. He is of Mexican heritage. He grew up in Riverside, Corona, Santa Ana, Baldwin Park, and Compton before settling in Section 8 low-income housing in Long Beach, where Iglesias spent most of his youth.

Career 
Iglesias worked for a cell phone company in Los Angeles and in 1997 went into comedy full-time, though it resulted in him being evicted from his home and losing his car.

Iglesias often references his weight in his comedy, often saying, "Oh, I'm not fat, I'm fluffy", elaborating that there were five levels of fatness, "Big", "Healthy", "Husky", "Fluffy", and "DAMN!!!" In 2009 he added a sixth level, "Oh hell, no."

In 2000, he appeared in the sixth season of the Nickelodeon sketch comedy series All That, co-starring with Amanda Bynes and Nick Cannon.

Iglesias was a contestant on the fourth season of reality TV series Last Comic Standing in 2006, surviving elimination to become one of the final eight comics. He was disqualified at that point for having used a smuggled BlackBerry to communicate with family and friends, which violated the rules of the show.

In 2007, Iglesias voiced an entire Mexican family in "Padre de Familia", a sixth season episode of the Fox TV animated comedy Family Guy. That same year, he began voicing a recurring set of identical twin characters on The Emperor's New School, a Disney animated series that he describes as his favorite voice work.

In 2011, Comedy Central debuted Gabriel Iglesias Presents Stand Up Revolution, a stand-up series that Iglesias produced and hosted, running for three seasons before ending in 2014.

Iglesias hosted/co-hosted six episodes of Equals Three, and played a strip club DJ and drug dealer in the 2012 film Magic Mike.

Iglesias voiced Ned and Zed in the 2013 DisneyToon Studios film, Planes. He also voiced characters in the animated films The Nut Job (2014) and El Americano: The Movie (2016).

Iglesias is featured in the reality series Fluffy Breaks Even, which premiered on Fuse on October 1, 2015. The show was renamed Fluffy's Food Adventures upon its third season renewal in January 2017. From 2019 to 2020, he played Gabe Iglesias, in Mr. Iglesias, a Netflix original series about a teacher at Woodrow Wilson High School in Long Beach, California.  In 2021, he voiced the character of Speedy Gonzales in the film Space Jam: A New Legacy and Picchu in Maya and the Three.

In 2022, Iglesias was the first comedian to sell out Dodger Stadium in Los Angeles. The concert was released to Netflix on October 18, 2022, as Stadium Fluffy.

Influences and style 
Iglesias’ comedy influences are Paul Rodriguez, Eddie Murphy, Robin Williams, and Bill Cosby. He is known for his trademark Hawaiian shirts.

Regarding how novice comedians can widen their fan base, Iglesias stated in a January 2016 interview:

Awards and honors 
On February 10, 2012, Iglesias was presented with several awards by the city of El Paso, Texas, including the key to the city and the Beacon of H.O.P.E Award from the nonprofit organization Operation H.O.P.E.

Personal life 
As of 2010, Iglesias lives in Whittier, California. He was in a long-term relationship with Claudia Valdez, with whom he has a stepson named Frankie. According to a June 2020 People article, he separated from Valdez in 2017, which led him to cancel some performances, and to quit drinking for two years. Despite the breakup, he still maintains a close relationship with Frankie, whom he helped raise.

He said the shock of being told he had two years to live prompted him to reevaluate how he took care of himself and explained that he decided to lose weight in order to ensure his continued presence in the lives of his family. Iglesias has also struggled with depression and alcoholism, which he attributes partly to burnout from his heavy touring schedule.

On July 15, 2021, on his 45th birthday, Iglesias tested positive for COVID-19, and cancelled his remaining shows at the Tobin Center for the Performing Arts as well as the taping of his upcoming comedy special.

Filmography

Film

Television

Discography 
 Hot and Fluffy (2008) Image Entertainment
 I'm Not Fat, I'm Fluffy (2009)
 We Luv Fluffy (2009)
 Aloha Fluffy (2013) Comedy Central
 I'm Sorry For What I Said While I Was Hungry (2016) Netflix
 One Show Fits All (2019) Netflix
 ''Stadium Fluffy (2022) Netflix

References

External links 

Living people
1976 births
20th-century American comedians
21st-century American comedians
American male actors of Mexican descent
20th-century American male actors
21st-century American male actors
American male comedians
American male film actors
American male television actors
American stand-up comedians
American impressionists (entertainers)
Comedians from California
Hispanic and Latino American male actors
Last Comic Standing contestants
Male actors from San Diego
Wilson Classical High School alumni